Holt v. Sarver was a court decision that was the first in a series of American common law cases that have found entire state prison systems in violation of prisoners' constitutional rights by inflicting cruel and unusual punishment.

The Arkansas prison system, which had no written standards, was found to violate the US Constitution. The cases significantly altered the American prison system, specifically with regard to prisoners' rights under the Eighth Amendment.

Arkansas cases
In 1969 in Holt v. Sarver I, 300 F. Supp. 825, Judge J. Smith Henley ruled several aspects of Arkansas' existing prison system unconstitutional. He issued guidelines to follow for correcting the problems, and ordered administrators to report on the progress of the implementation of these guidelines.

In 1970 in Holt v. Sarver II, 309 F. Supp. 362, Judge Henley ruled the entire Arkansas prison system unconstitutional and ordered the State Correction Board to devise a plan of action. In that same case in 1971, Judge Henley enjoined the Arkansas prison from preventing the inmates' access to court and from inflicting cruel and unusual punishment upon them.

Prior history
The Supreme Court ruled in Jones v. Cunningham  in 1963 that inmates in state institutions could file a writ of habeas corpus challenging the conditions of  their  imprisonment as well as its legality. This ruling reversed  the Supreme Court's "hands off" policy regarding federal interference in state penal issues first clearly stated in 1866 in Pervear v. Massachusetts. Subsequently, in a series of cases starting with Gates v. Collier the federal government began whole scale intervention in the constitutionality of the operation of state prison systems.

See also
Trusty system
Gates v. Collier
Pervear v. Massachusetts

Footnotes

External links
Policy Making and the Modern State: How the Courts Reformed America

History of Arkansas
Cruel and Unusual Punishment Clause case law
United States district court cases
Penology
Imprisonment and detention in the United States
United States District Court case articles without infoboxes